Sławno  is a village in the administrative district of Gmina Kiszkowo, within Gniezno County, Greater Poland Voivodeship, in west-central Poland.

The village has a population of 435. It has a church which lies on the Wooden Churches Trail around Puszcza Zielonka.

References

Villages in Gniezno County